Leonidas I (died 19 September 480 BC) was a king of the Greek city-state of Sparta, and the 17th of the Agiad line, a dynasty which claimed descent from the mythological demigod Heracles. Leonidas I was son of King Anaxandridas II. He succeeded his half-brother King Cleomenes I to the throne in c. 489 BC. His co-ruler was King Leotychidas. He was succeeded by his son, King Pleistarchus.

Leonidas had a notable participation in the Second Greco-Persian War, where he led the allied Greek forces to a last stand at the Battle of Thermopylae (480 BC) while attempting to defend the pass from the invading Persian army; he died at the battle and entered myth as the leader of the 300 Spartans. While the Greeks lost this battle, they were able to expel the Persian invaders in the following year.

Life
According to Herodotus, Leonidas' mother was not only his father's wife but also his father's niece and had been barren for so long that the ephors, the five annually elected administrators of the Spartan constitution, tried to prevail upon King Anaxandridas II to set her aside and take another wife.  Anaxandridas refused, claiming his wife was blameless, whereupon the ephors agreed to allow him to take a second wife without setting aside his first.  This second wife, a descendant of Chilon of Sparta (one of the Seven Sages of Greece), promptly bore a son, Cleomenes. However, one year after Cleomenes' birth, Anaxandridas' first wife also gave birth to a son, Dorieus. Leonidas was the second son of Anaxandridas' first wife, and either the elder brother or twin of Cleombrotus. 

King Anaxandridas II died in 520 BC, and Cleomenes succeeded to the throne sometime between then and 516 BC. Dorieus was so outraged that the Spartans had preferred his half-brother over himself that he found it impossible to remain in Sparta. He made one unsuccessful attempt to set up a colony in Africa and, when this failed, sought his fortune in Sicily, where after initial successes he was killed.  Leonidas' relationship with his bitterly antagonistic elder brothers is unknown, but he married Cleomenes' daughter, Gorgo, sometime before coming to the throne in 490 BC.

Leonidas was heir to the Agiad throne and a full citizen (homoios) at the time of the Battle of Sepeia against Argos (c. 494 BC). Likewise, he was a full citizen when the Persians sought submission from Sparta and met with vehement rejection in or around 492/491 BC.  His elder half-brother, king Cleomenes, had already been deposed on grounds of purported insanity, and had fled into exile when Athens sought assistance against the First Persian invasion of Greece, that ended at Marathon (490 BC).

Plutarch wrote, “When someone said to him: 'Except for being king you are not at all superior to us,' Leonidas son of Anaxandridas and brother of Cleomenes replied: 'But were I not better than you, I should not be king.'" The product of the agoge, Leonidas was unlikely to have been referring to his royal blood alone but rather suggesting that, like his brother Dorieus, he had proved himself superior in the competitive environment of Spartan training and society, thus making him qualified to rule.

Leonidas was chosen to lead the combined Greek forces determined to resist the Second Persian invasion of Greece in 481 BC. This was not simply a tribute to Sparta's military prowess:  The probability that the coalition wanted Leonidas personally for his capability as a military leader is underlined by the fact that just two years after his death, the coalition preferred Athenian leadership to the leadership of either Leotychidas or Leonidas' successor (as regent for his still under-aged son) Pausanias. The rejection of Leotychidas and Pausanias was not a reflection on Spartan arms. Sparta's military reputation had never stood in higher regard, nor was Sparta less powerful in 478 BC than it had been in 481 BC.

This selection of Leonidas to lead the defense of Greece against Xerxes' invasion led to Leonidas' death in the Battle of Thermopylae in 480 BC.

Battle of Thermopylae

Upon receiving a request from the confederated Greek forces to aid in defending Greece against the Persian invasion, Sparta consulted the Oracle at Delphi.  The Oracle is said to have made the following prophecy in hexameter verse:

In August 480 BC, Leonidas marched out of Sparta to meet Xerxes' army at Thermopylae with a small force of 1,200 men (900 helots and 300 Spartan hoplites), where he was joined by forces from other Greek city-states, who put themselves under his command to form an army of 7,000 strong.  There are various theories on why Leonidas was accompanied by such a small force of hoplites.  According to Herodotus, "the Spartans sent the men with Leonidas on ahead so that the rest of the allies would see them and march with no fear of defeat, instead of siding with the Persians like the others if they learned that the Spartans were delaying. After completing their festival, the Carneia, they left their garrison at Sparta and marched in full force towards Thermopylae. The rest of the allies planned to do likewise, for the Olympiad coincided with these events. They accordingly sent their advance guard, not expecting the war at Thermopylae to be decided so quickly." Many modern commentators are unsatisfied with this explanation and point to the fact that the Olympic Games were in progress or impute internal dissent and intrigue.

Whatever the reason Sparta's own contribution was just 300 Spartiates (accompanied by their attendants and probably perioikoi auxiliaries), the total force assembled for the defense of the pass of Thermopylae came to something between four and seven thousand Greeks. They faced a Persian army who had invaded from the north of Greece under Xerxes I. Herodotus stated that this army consisted of over two million men; modern scholars consider this to be an exaggeration and give estimates ranging from 70,000 to 300,000.

Xerxes waited four days to attack, hoping the Greeks would disperse. Finally, on the fifth day the Persians attacked. Leonidas and the Greeks repulsed the Persians' frontal attacks for the fifth and sixth days, killing roughly 10,000 of the enemy troops. The Persian elite unit known to the Greeks as "the Immortals" was held back, and two of Xerxes' brothers (Abrocomes and Hyperanthes) died in battle. On the seventh day (August 11), a Malian Greek traitor named Ephialtes led the Persian general Hydarnes by a mountain track to the rear of the Greeks. At that point Leonidas sent away all Greek troops and remained in the pass with his 300 Spartans, 900 helots, 400 Thebans and 700 Thespians. The Thespians stayed entirely of their own will, declaring that they would not abandon Leonidas and his followers. Their leader was Demophilus, son of Diadromes, and as Herodotus writes, "Hence they lived with the Spartans and died with them."

One theory provided by Herodotus is that Leonidas sent away the remainder of his men because he cared about their safety. The King would have thought it wise to preserve those Greek troops for future battles against the Persians, but he knew that the Spartans could never abandon their post on the battlefield. The soldiers who stayed behind were to protect their escape against the Persian cavalry. Herodotus himself believed that Leonidas gave the order because he perceived the allies to be disheartened and unwilling to encounter the danger to which his own mind was made up. He therefore chose to dismiss all troops except the Thebans, Thespians and helots and save the glory for the Spartans.

Of the small Greek force, attacked from both sides, all were killed except for the 400 Thebans, who surrendered to Xerxes without a fight. When Leonidas was killed, the Spartans retrieved his body after driving back the Persians four times. Herodotus says that Xerxes' orders were to have Leonidas' head cut off and put on a stake and his body crucified. This was considered sacrilegious.

Legacy

Antiquity
A hero cult of Leonidas survived at Sparta until the Antonine era (2nd century AD).

Thermopylae monument

A bronze statue of Leonidas was erected at Thermopylae in 1955. A sign, under the statue, reads simply: "ΜΟΛΩΝ ΛΑΒΕ" ("Come and take them"), which was Leonidas' laconic reply when Xerxes offered to spare the lives of the Spartans if they gave up their arms.

Another statue, also with the inscription ΜΟΛΩΝ ΛΑΒΕ, was erected at Sparta in 1968.

Literature

Leonidas was the name of an Epic poem written by Richard Glover, which originally appeared in 1737. It went on to appear in four other editions, being expanded from 9 books to 12.

He is a central figure in Steven Pressfield's novel Gates of Fire.

He appears as the protagonist of Frank Miller's 1998 comic book series 300. It presents a fictionalized version of Leonidas and the Battle of Thermopylae, as does the 2006 feature film adapted from it.

Helena P. Schrader has produced a three-part biographical novel on Leonidas. Leonidas of Sparta: A Boy of the Agoge, Leonidas of Sparta: A Peerless Peer, and Leonidas of Sparta: A Heroic King.

Film

In cinema, Leonidas has been portrayed by:
Richard Egan in the 1962 epic The 300 Spartans.
Gerard Butler in the 2006 film 300, inspired by the graphic novel of the same name by Frank Miller and Lynn Varley. Tyler Neitzel portrayed Leonidas as a young man. 
Sean Maguire in the 2008 film Meet the Spartans, a parody of the 2006 film.

Notes

References
 Herodotus, Herodotus, with an English translation by A. D. Godley. Cambridge. Harvard University Press. 1920.
 Jones, A. H. M. Sparta, New York, Barnes and Nobles, 1967
 Morris, Ian Macgregor, Leonidas: Hero of Thermopylae, New York, The Rosen Publishing Group, 2004.

 
6th-century BC births
480 BC deaths
5th-century BC rulers
5th-century BC Spartans
Agiad kings of Sparta
Battle of Thermopylae
Spartans of the Greco-Persian Wars
Ancient Greeks killed in battle
Greek culture
Monarchs killed in action